Charlyann Pizzarello (born 12 September 1997) is a Gibraltarian footballer who plays as a midfielder for FA Women's National League Division One North side Newcastle United and the Gibraltar women's national team.

Early life 
Pizzarello was raised in Gibraltar.

College career 
Pizzarello has attended the Indian Hills Community College and the Graceland University in the United States.

She scored 12 goals in 33 appearances for Indian Hills.

Club career 
In Gibraltar, Pizzarello played for Lions Gibraltar and Lincoln Red Imps, briefly returning Lincoln in 2018 between her stints at college. In 2021 it was initially reported that she had signed for ADC Esteponense in Spain, but later signed for Malaga City, making her debut on 31 October 2021 against Marbella Promesas in a 3-0 win. After the regular season, she transferred to CD Guadalajara.

On 14 July 2022 Pizzarello went professional, joining Rayo Vallecano of the Spanish second flight on a one year deal. However, visa issues caused the deal to fall through, and on 12 September she instead signed for Women's Championship side Lewes. Seeing chances limited at the Rookettes, Pizzarello moved again in January 2023, joining ambitious Newcastle United on a free transfer.

International career 
Pizzarello made her senior debut for Gibraltar on 24 June 2021 in a 1–4 friendly away loss to Liechtenstein. She scored her first international goal against the same opposition in November that year, creating a 1-0 win at Gibraltar's Victoria Stadium.

References

External links 
 

1997 births
Living people
Gibraltarian women's footballers
Women's association football midfielders
Lincoln Red Imps F.C. players
Lions Gibraltar F.C. Women players
Lewes F.C. Women players
Newcastle United W.F.C. players
Indian Hills Warriors athletes
College women's soccer players in the United States
Graceland Yellowjackets women's soccer players
Gibraltar women's international footballers
Gibraltarian expatriate footballers
Gibraltarian expatriates in the United States
Expatriate women's soccer players in the United States
Gibraltarian expatriate sportspeople in the United States
Gibraltarian expatriate sportspeople in Spain
Expatriate women's footballers in Spain
Expatriate women's footballers in England
Gibraltarian expatriate sportspeople in England